The fifth season of the ABC American television drama series How to Get Away with Murder was ordered on May 11, 2018, by ABC. It began airing on September 27, 2018, with 15 episodes like the previous seasons and concluded on February 28, 2019. This was made in a deal with Viola Davis that the series would be a limited series with only 15 or 16 episodes per season.

Plot
Season 5 picks up after Annalise's (Viola Davis) class action victory in the Supreme Court, with Michaela (Aja Naomi King), Connor (Jack Falahee), Asher (Matt McGorry) and Laurel (Karla Souza) moving on with the next chapter of their lives.

Cast and characters

Main
 Viola Davis as Annalise Keating
 Billy Brown as Nate Lahey
 Jack Falahee as Connor Walsh
 Rome Flynn as Gabriel Maddox
 Aja Naomi King as Michaela Pratt
 Matt McGorry as Asher Millstone
 Conrad Ricamora as Oliver Hampton
 Karla Souza as Laurel Castillo
 Amirah Vann as Tegan Price
 Charlie Weber as Frank Delfino
 Liza Weil as Bonnie Winterbottom
 Timothy Hutton as Emmett Crawford

Recurring
 John Hensley as Ronald Miller
 Tamberla Perry as Theresa Hoff
 Jessica Marie Garcia as Rhonda Navarro
 Glynn Turman as Nate Lahey Sr.
 Elizabeth Morton as Julie Winterbottom
 Laura Innes as Lynne Birkhead
 Cynthia Stevenson as Pam Walsh
 Melinda Page Hamilton as Claire Telesco
 Terrell Clayton as Jeffrey Sykes
 William R. Moses as Special Agent Lanford

Guest
 Mia Katigbak as Joanna Hampton
 Heidi Sulzman as Molly Keener
 Teya Patt as Paula Gladden
 Tom Verica as Sam Keating
 D.W. Moffett as Jeff Walsh
 Jim Abele as Ted Walsh
 Dante Verica as young Gabriel Maddox
 Famke Janssen as Eve Rothlo
 Tess Harper as Sheila Miller
 Cicely Tyson as Ophelia Harkness
 Gerardo Celasco as Xavier Castillo

Episodes

Production

Development
How to Get Away with Murder was renewed for a fifth season on May 11, 2018, by ABC. In July 2018, series creator and showrunner Peter Nowalk told Deadline Hollywood his plans for the fifth season, confirming that the wedding between Jack Falahee and Conrad Ricamora's characters would take place, as well as a flashback episode further exploring the marriage between Viola Davis and Tom Verica's characters Annalise and Sam Keating, respectively. Additionally, he stated that the season's flashforwards were expected to be "twisty, and more fun", and tonally different. The first table read occurred on July 13, 2018.

Casting
In June 2018, Rome Flynn was promoted to the series' main cast after appearing in a guest capacity in the fourth-season finale. In July 2018, Amirah Vann was promoted to the series' main cast after recurring in the fourth season. Later that month, Timothy Hutton joined the main cast.

Filming
Filming for the season started on July 19, 2018.

Reception

Critical response
On review aggregator Rotten Tomatoes, the fifth season has a rating of 83%, based on six reviews, with an average rating of 7.67/10. Writing for The A.V. Club, Kayla Kumari Upadhyaya criticized the "messy" storytelling of the season and the series as a whole.

Ratings

References

External links
 
 

2018 American television seasons
2019 American television seasons
Season 5